Professor Ralph Kenna (born 27 August 1964) is an Irish mathematician and theoretical physicist who is head of the statistical physics research group at Coventry University. He is a specialist in critical phenomena and sociophysics.

Early life and education
Kenna was born in Athlone, County Westmeath, Ireland, on 27 August 1964. He obtained his B.A. (mod) degree in Theoretical Physics in 1985 and his M.Sc. degree in 1988 both from Trinity College Dublin. He completed his PhD at the University of Graz under Professor Christian Lang in 1993.

Career
Kenna was an EU Marie Curie Research Fellow at the University of Liverpool (1994–1997) and at Trinity College Dublin (1997–1999). He lectured at Trinity College from 1998 to 2002 and has been with Coventry University since 2002. In 2005, he co-founded the Applied Mathematics Research Centre there.

His research interests relate to field theory, statistical physics of phase transitions
and complex systems.

Kenna has used quantitative approaches to track the evolution of ancient narratives such as Homer's Iliad.

Selected publications
Maths meets myths: Quantitative approaches to ancient narratives. Springer, 2016. (Editor with Máirín MacCarron & Pádraig MacCarron) 

Narrative structure of A Song of Ice and Fire creates a fictional world with realistic measures of social complexity. Proceedings of the National Academy of Sciences, Vol. 117 No. 46 November 17, 2020. (With Thomas Gessey-Jones, Robin Dunbar, Pádraig MacCarron, Cathal O’Conchobhair & Joseph Yose)
https://www.pnas.org/doi/full/10.1073/pnas.2006465117

References

Living people
1964 births
Academics of Coventry University
Academics of the University of Liverpool
Academics of Trinity College Dublin
Alumni of Trinity College Dublin
Irish physicists
Irish mathematicians
People from Athlone
University of Graz alumni